Arunachal Pradesh Lokayukta is the Parliamentary Ombudsman for the state of Arunachal Pradesh (India). It is a high level statutory functionary, created to address grievances of the public against ministers, legislators, administration and public servants in issues related to misuse of power, mal-administration and corruption. It was first formed under the Arunachal Pradesh Lokayukta and Deputy Lokayukta Act-2014 and approved by the president of India. The passage of The Lokpal and Lokayuktas Act, 2013 in Parliament had become law from January 16, 2014 and requires each state to appoint its Lokayukta within a year.  A bench of Lokayukta should consist of judicial and non-judicial members. An Upa-Lokayukta is a deputy to Lokayukta and assists him in his work and acts in-charge Lokayukta in case the position fells vacant before time.

A Lokayukta of the state is appointed to office by the state Governor after consulting the committee consisting of State Chief Minister, Speaker of Legislative Assembly, Leader of Opposition, or leader of largest opposition party in State Legislature, Chairman of Legislative Council and Leader of Opposition of Legislative Council and cannot be removed from office except for reasons specified in the Act and will serve the period of five years.

History and administration 
Arunachal Pradesh Lokayukta Act-2014 was passed  in the Arunachal Pradesh Assembly and was effective from 4 March 2014. Lokayukta office in the state is located at Golden Jubilee Banquet Hall, Itanagar. The Lokayukta bench of the state should have a Chairperson serving as Chief Justice of High Court or Judge of Supreme Court, and two members, one being Schedule Tribe from state as Judicial member and other being a woman member. The bill for amendment of State Lokayukta was passed in 2019.

Oath or affirmation

Powers 
Arunachal Pradesh Lokayukta has complete and exclusive authority for enquiring into allegations or complaints against the State Chief Minister, State Deputy Chief Minister, Ministers of the state Government, Leader of Opposition and Government officials. Lokayukta Act of the state which serves as its tool against corruption covers Chief Ministers, ex-Chief Ministers, NGOs, Government officials, Ministers and all public servants.

Appointment and tenure 
First Lokayukta of Arunachal Pradesh is Justice Prasanta Kumar Saikia being appointed on 27 June 2019 and member of Lokayukta is former IAS officer Yeshi Tsering and will have a term of five years or reaching of the age of 70 years, whichever is earlier.

See also 
 Lokpal and Lokayukta Act,2013
 Uttar Pradesh Lokayukta
 Andhra Pradesh Lokayukta
 Delhi Lokayukta
 Himachal Pradesh Lokayukta

References

External links 
 Official website

2014 establishments in Arunachal Pradesh
Lokayuktas
Government of Arunachal Pradesh
Government agencies established in 2014